The List of data references for chemical elements is divided into datasheets that give values for many properties of the elements, together with various references. Each datasheet is sequenced by atomic number.

References for chemical elements 
 List of chemical elements — with basic properties like standard atomic weight, m.p., b.p., abundance
 Abundance of the chemical elements
 Abundances of the elements (data page) — Earth's crust, sea water, Sun and solar system
 Abundance of elements in Earth's crust
 Atomic radii of the elements (data page) — atomic radius (empirical), atomic radius (calculated), van der Waals radius, covalent radius
 Boiling points of the elements (data page) — Boiling point
 Critical points of the elements (data page) — Critical point
 Densities of the elements (data page) — Density (solid, liquid, gas)
 Elastic properties of the elements (data page) — Young's modulus, Poisson ratio, bulk modulus, shear modulus
 Electrical resistivities of the elements (data page) — Electrical resistivity
 Electron affinity (data page) — Electron affinity
 Electron configurations of the elements (data page) — Electron configuration of the gaseous atoms in the ground state
 Electronegativities of the elements (data page) — Electronegativity (Pauling scale)
 Hardnesses of the elements (data page) — Mohs hardness, Vickers hardness, Brinell hardness
 Heat capacities of the elements (data page) — Heat capacity
 Heats of fusion of the elements (data page) — Heat of fusion
 Heats of vaporization of the elements (data page) — Heat of vaporization
 Ionization energies of the elements (data page) — Ionization energy (in eV) and molar ionization energies (in kJ/mol)
 Melting points of the elements (data page) — Melting point
 Oxidation states of the elements — Oxidation state
 Speeds of sound of the elements (data page) — Speed of sound
 Thermal conductivities of the elements (data page) — Thermal conductivity
 Thermal expansion coefficients of the elements (data page) — Thermal expansion
 Vapor pressures of the elements (data page) — Vapor pressure